Jameh Mosque of Sabzevar is one of the oldest mosques in Sabzevar, built during the Sarbadars period.

Sources 

Mosques in Iran
Mosque buildings with domes
National works of Iran
Tourist attractions in Razavi Khorasan Province
Sabzevar